The East Branch Mattawamkeag River is a tributary of the Mattawamkeag River in Aroostook County, Maine.

Pleasant Lake

Pleasant Lake is the largest lake in the East Branch watershed. The lake extends from the northeast corner of Island Falls into the northwest corner of Maine township 4, range 3. The lake supports populations of smallmouth bass and rainbow smelt, and is stocked with brook trout and land-locked Atlantic salmon. There is an unimproved boat launch area at the western end of the lake.

See also
List of rivers of Maine

References

Maine Streamflow Data from the USGS
Maine Watershed Data From Environmental Protection Agency

Rivers of Aroostook County, Maine
Tributaries of the Penobscot River